Timothy Brian Alexander May (born 26 January 1962) is a former Australian cricketer for South Australia. He was, until June 2013, a leading players' representative in his role as Chief Executive of the Federation of International Cricketers' Associations (FICA). May played in 24 Tests and 47 ODIs in an injury-interrupted career between 1987 and 1995.

International career
In his first test after being recalled in 1993, against the West Indies at Adelaide Oval, May had his best Test match bowling figures of 5/9. In the final innings of the same match he had his best batting score of 42 not out, as Australia lost to the West Indies by 1 run.

After cricket
In 1997, May became the inaugural CEO of the Australian Cricketers' Association and was a significant influence in its establishment as an important organisation in Australian cricket. In June 2005, he was appointed as the CEO of FICA, based in Austin, Texas. May was the driving force behind the staging of the World Cricket Tsunami Appeal match in 2004. On 5 June 2013 May announced his resignation as CEO of FICA.

References

External links

1962 births
Living people
Cricketers from Adelaide
Australia One Day International cricketers
Australia Test cricketers
South Australia cricketers
Australian chief executives
Kensington cricketers
Australian cricketers